Crook Hill is a small hill in the Peak District National Park in the English county of Derbyshire,  northeast of Castleton.

Overview 
The hill is situated above the A57 Snake Pass road between Sheffield and Manchester as it passes Ladybower Reservoir. Crook Hill is regarded as an outlier of Kinder Scout although the two are separated by the long western arm of Ladybower Reservoir. Geologically, the hill consists of Kinder Scout Grit, a kind of sandstone. Both the hill's summits give excellent views of the surrounding countryside with Ladybower Reservoir, Derwent Edge and Win Hill being the main attractions. Between the two summits there is some evidence of an ancient megalithic standing stone circle. The circle originally consisted of five stones around a surviving mound of which only two are still upright.

Ascents 
Crook Hill is normally climbed from the Derwent valley road just as it leaves the A57: a bridleway leaves the small car park at grid reference  and climbs steeply and muddily up to Crookhill Farm, a working sheep farm owned by the National Trust which also offers accommodation to tourists. Once the farm is passed, a stile is climbed onto the open sheep pasture and it is then a straightforward walk to the two twin summits, which are on designated access land.

References 

Mountains and hills of the Peak District
Mountains and hills of Derbyshire